Ivan Ivanić (Bačko Gradište, Bečej, Austria-Hungary, 24 April 1867 – Belgrade, Kingdom of Yugoslavia, 31 January 1935) was a Serbian diplomat of the Kingdom of Serbia and author of numerous ethnographical works about Serbia and the Balkans. He also wrote travel literature about the region of Old Serbia.

Biography

He began his diplomatic career as a secretary in the Serbian consulate in Priština. He later became vice consul and consul in Priština and Skopje (Kosovo Vilayet).  He was later appointed as consul in Bitola (then Monastir Vilayet).

He participated in both public and secret Serbian activities to provide assistance to Macedonian rebels against the Ottoman Empire. He met his wife Delfa in Skopje, where she was a teacher between 1900 and 1903. She was one of the founders of the Circle of Serbian Sisters, an organization whose establishment was proposed by Ivan Ivanić together with Branislav Nušić. They were childless and the name of their stepdaughter was Ivanka.

On 29 November 1912 he was appointed as the first governor of the Durrës County, while his wife Delfa led the city hospital in Durrës.

Besides his work as diplomat, Ivanić was editor of numerous magazines published in Serbian. In April 1887 he became the editor of "Sremac". Ivanić was one of two editors of the first issue of the magazine "Vardar". He also edited the magazine "Golub" which was published in 1905 in Istanbul and distributed to Serbs in the Ottoman Empire.

Ivanić added his personal notes in works about Kosovo, Macedonia and the Serbian Orthodox Church and those notes were subject of different opinions of later researchers.

Selected works

References 

Serbian diplomats
Serbian journalists
Serbian non-fiction writers
Serbian ethnographers
20th-century Serbian historians
Serbian male short story writers
Serbian short story writers
1867 births
1935 deaths
Serbian travel writers
Austro-Hungarian Serbs
People from Bečej
People from the Kingdom of Serbia
Male non-fiction writers
19th-century Serbian historians